In economics, the overtaking criterion is used to compare infinite streams of outcomes. Mathematically, it is used to properly define a notion of optimality for a problem of optimal control on an unbounded time interval.

Often, the decisions of a policy-maker may have influences that extend to the far future. Economic decisions made today may influence the economic growth of a nation for an unknown number of years into the future. In such cases, it is often convenient to model the future outcomes as an infinite stream. Then, it may be required to compare two infinite streams and decide which one of them is better (for example, in order to decide on a policy). The overtaking criterion is one option to do this comparison.

Notation 
 is the set of possible outcomes. E.g., it may be the set of positive real numbers, representing the possible annual gross domestic product. It is normalized

 is the set of infinite sequences of possible outcomes.

 is a partial order. Given two infinite sequences , it is possible that  is weakly better or that  is weakly better or that they are incomparable.

Cardinal definition 
 is called the "overtaking criterion" if there is an infinite sequence of real-valued functions  such that:

      iff       

An alternative condition is:

      iff       

Examples:

1. In the following example, :

This shows that a difference in a single time period may affect the entire sequence.

2.

This also shows that the overtaking criterion cannot be represented by a single cardinal utility function. I.e, there is no real-valued function  such that  iff . One way to see this is: for every  and :

In contrast, every set of disjoint nonempty segments in  must be a countable set.

Ordinal definition 

 is called the "overtaking criterion" if it satisfies the following axioms:

1. For every ,  is a complete order on 

2.

3. For each ,  is preferentially-independent (see Debreu theorems#Additivity of ordinal utility function for a definition).

4.       iff       

Every partial order that satisfies these axioms, also satisfies the first cardinal definition.

As explained above, some sequences may be incomparable by the overtaking criterion.

Applications 
The overtaking criterion is used in economic growth theory.

It is also used in repeated games theory, as an alternative to the limit-of-means criterion and the discounted-sum criterion. See Folk theorem (game theory)#Overtaking.

See also 
 Debreu theorems
 Cardinal utility
 Ordinal utility

References 

Economic growth